Fleur Saville (born 14 July 1984) is a New Zealand television actress best known for her roles in the television sitcoms Being Eve and The Tribe in which she became known to international audiences for her portrayal of Ruby. Saville previously acted on New Zealand soap opera Shortland Street, playing the personal assistant Libby Jeffries for the CEO of Shortland Street Hospital.

Saville has many interests, including horse riding and martial arts. She also enjoys a close friendship with actresses who played her on-screen sisters, Anna Jullienne and Faye Smythe, and Beth Allen, who played Dr Brooke Freeman. Since her days in Shortland Street, Saville has made sporadic appearances in television. Since 2017, she has retired from acting and remains out of the spotlight. In 2022, 
she returned to acting.

Early years
Saville has played many theatrical roles on stage and in theatres all around the country, such as The Sound of Music, Charlie and the Chocolate Factory and the musical production of Oliver!.

Filmography

Film

Television

Theatre

Voice work
Saville has done many voice overs for television commercials, including Wella Bellady, Environment Waikato, Road Safety, Route 66 & McDonald's. She also voiced Diva from the video game Final Fantasy Type-0 HD.

References

External links

Living people
1984 births
New Zealand television actresses
New Zealand stage actresses
New Zealand soap opera actresses
People from Auckland
21st-century New Zealand actresses